Changi Air Base (East), or Changi East Complex is a facility extending the facilities of Changi Air Base, the existing facilities hence renamed Changi Air Base (West). Built on a 2 square kilometre site of reclaimed land, the new base was located approximately 2 kilometres east of Singapore Changi Airport and approximately 1.5 kilometres west of Changi Naval Base. Groundbreaking took place on 15 July 2002 and it was officially opened on 29 November 2004. A new runway (02R/20L) was built and the length was approximately 2,748 metres (9,015 ft), it has since been lengthened to 4,000 metres.

Location
The new base houses the Republic of Singapore Air Force's 145 Squadron, which comprises the extended-range, attack-oriented F-16D Block 52+ Fighting Falcons, as well as the 208 Squadron, the 808 Squadron and the 508 Squadron.

The proximity of the South China Sea to the air base gives it an advantage over Tengah Air Base and Paya Lebar Air Base as the F-16 jets from Changi can make a faster and shorter trip out to training areas over the South China Sea, compared to their counterparts from other air bases. The 145 Squadron can save as much as five to seven minutes of transit time, which means they also save on fuel and further reducing costs.

In the future, the runway will be extended to 4,000 metres to accommodate further growth in passenger, cargo and air traffic as construction of Terminal 5 gets underway.

As part of Changi Airport's expansion and to accommodate the eventual relocation of Paya Lebar Airbase, the air base was closed for expansion works and re-opened at the end of 2018.

Organisation
 112 Sqn 6 Airbus A330 MRTT (Aerial refuelling)
145 Squadron with 20 F-16D Blk 52+ (Strike)

Singapore Airshow
Also, located just beyond the northern edge perimeter fencing of the air base is the permanent venue of the new Changi Exhibition Centre for the Singapore Airshow which was completed in September 2007 and had hosted the recently inaugurated Singapore Airshow 2008 in February 2008. The most recent Airshow was held from 11–16 February 2020.

40th Anniversary of Five Power Defence Arrangements
On 1 November 2011, Singapore hosted the Five Power Defence Arrangements (FPDA)'s 40th-anniversary celebrations, with the defence ministers, aircraft and servicemen from all five signatory countries converging on the air base to participate in the event. Amongst the participating aircraft spotted roosting at the dispersal area of the air base were Republic of Singapore Air Force's F-15SG Strike Eagle, Royal Air Force's Typhoon FGR4, Royal Australian Air Force's F/A-18A Hornets, Royal Malaysian Air Force's F/A-18D Hornets and Royal New Zealand Air Force's P-3K2 Orions. Later, a gala dinner was hosted by Singapore's defence minister, Ng Eng Hen, at Singapore's Istana whereupon they called on the Prime Minister of Singapore, Lee Hsien Loong, to discuss a multitude of issues. Codenamed Exercise Bersama Lima, the three days joint exercise is expected to test the readiness and cooperation between all participating countries and should conclude on 4 November 2011.

See also
Republic of Singapore Air Force
Singapore Airshow
Changi Naval Base

References

External links
RSAF web page on Changi Air Base (CAB)
Official Opening
News article on new airbase
Satellite image of Changi Airbase (East) and 02R/20L runway - Google Maps

Changi
Airports in Singapore
Camps and bases of the Singapore Armed Forces
Republic of Singapore Air Force
Republic of Singapore Air Force bases